New York State Route 440 (NY 440) is a state highway located entirely on Staten Island in New York City. The route acts as a connector between the two segments of New Jersey Route 440, running from the Staten Island community of Richmond Valley in the south to Port Richmond in the north. NY 440 is connected to the two New Jersey segments by the Outerbridge Crossing to the south and the Bayonne Bridge to the north. It is one of several signed New York State routes that are not connected to any others in the state, and one of only two NYS routes (NY 426 being the other) that is the middle section of another state's highway bearing the same number. Much of NY 440 is a limited-access highway. From the Korean War Veterans Parkway to Interstate 278 (I-278), it is known as the West Shore Expressway. North of I-278, it is named the Dr. Martin Luther King Jr. Expressway (also known as the Willowbrook Expressway). NY 440 is the southernmost state route in the state of New York.

Route description

NY 440 begins at the New York–New Jersey state line, mid-span on the east-west Outerbridge Crossing over the Arthur Kill in the Richmond Valley neighborhood of Staten Island. The four-lane bridge crosses east through Richmond Valley and over Arthur Kill Road.

After entering Staten Island, NY 440 passes through a toll barrier for eastbound traffic entering the city. Immediately following the toll barrier is a ramp to Page Avenue, the eastbound exit 1. In the westbound direction, the ramp to Arthur Kill Road is exit 1.

After Page Avenue, NY 440 enters a partial cloverleaf interchange with the Korean War Veterans Parkway (the KWVP, though often referred to as the Richmond Parkway, its name until 1997) and a nearby park and ride. At exit 2 in the Pleasant Plains neighborhood, NY 440 exits the right-of-way it entered on, which becomes the KWVP, while NY 440 proceeds north as the co-signed West Shore Expressway.

The West Shore Expressway continues north as a four-lane expressway, entering exit 3, a ramp to Woodrow Road going northbound. Crossing into the Rossville neighborhood, the expressway enters exit 3 southbound, connecting to Bloomingdale Road, and parallels a section of the Arthur Kill. Crossing north of South Shore Golf Course, the West Shore enters exit 4, an interchange with Huguenot Avenue. Continuing northeast, NY 440 is routed parallel with the eastern side of the former Fresh Kills Landfill, with exit 5 providing access to Arden Avenue. Bending northward once again, the West Shore crosses over Fresh Kills creek, and passes through a portion of the William T. Davis Wildlife Refuge. West Shore continues through the Chelsea-Travis neighborhood, accessible at exit 7 through a service road interchange with Victory Boulevard (itself previously designated as NY 439A, until ).

Running along the northern end of Travis, the West Shore Expressway parallels nearby railroad tracks before entering exit 8, a ramp to South Avenue and the Bloomfield neighborhood. Just a bit further north, the expressway enters exit 9 northbound, a single ramp to Glen Street. Just north of Glen Street, the West Shore Expressway enters a semi-directional T interchange with the northwest-southeast Staten Island Expressway portion of I-278. At this interchange, NY 440 and I-278 become concurrent for a short distance on the Staten Island Expressway, a four-lane expressway along the northern tier of Staten Island. Along this stretch, NY 440 and I-278 meet Richmond Avenue at exit 7. Just to the east, the expressway enters exit 9, which serves as a junction with the Dr. Martin Luther King Jr. Expressway (the Dr. MLK Jr., also known, for its initial portion, as the Willowbrook Expressway).

NY 440 turns north off I-278 and continues as the Dr. MLK Jr., just north of a junction with Victory Boulevard. The Dr. MLK Jr. crosses north through Staten Island, with the neighborhoods of Graniteville then Mariners Harbor on the west side, while Westerleigh then Elm Park (technically a portion of the Port Richmond neighborhood) are on the east side. Dr. MLK Jr. enters exit 12, a junction with Forest Avenue (the portion used by the previously designated, until 1968, NY 439), forming a "four corners" of the neighborhoods just mentioned. Continuing north, Dr. MLK Jr. enters exit 13, which connects to Walker Street in Port Richmond. Just north of exit 13, NY 440 passes through an electronic toll collection gantry (for traffic crossing from New Jersey over the Bergen Point Reach to enter onto the northside of Staten Island), then slopes onto the abutments of the Bayonne Bridge, condensing to four lanes. A short distance to the north, NY 440 crosses the state line back into New Jersey, continuing north as Route 440 and County Route 501 into the city of Bayonne.

History
{
  "type": "ExternalData",
  "service": "page",
  "title": "Willowbrook Parkway Extension.map"
}

NY 440 was initially designated in 1949, beginning at the Outerbridge Crossing and ending at the Bayonne Bridge, as it does today; however, the route was originally routed on Drumgoole Boulevard and Richmond Avenue in between the two bridges. In the early 1950s, proposals surfaced for the Willowbrook Parkway, which would extend from Staten Island Marine Park (later Great Kills Park and now part of the Gateway National Recreation Area) on the island's East Shore to the Bayonne Bridge via Egbertville and Bulls Head. A second highway, the West Shore Expressway, was proposed . As proposed, it would begin at the Outerbridge Crossing and run along the west shore of Staten Island to meet the Clove Lakes Expressway (I-278) near the Goethals Bridge.
The first section of the Willowbrook Parkway—from I-278 north to modern exit 13—was completed by 1965. A short extension south to Victory Boulevard was opened to traffic by 1968. The highway was also renamed the Willowbrook Expressway by this time. It was never extended past Victory Boulevard as opposition from both local property owners and environmental activists prevented construction of the rest of the highway. Its original route has never been formally demapped, however. NY 440 was realigned to follow the Willowbrook Expressway by 1970.

Drumgoole Boulevard was transformed into a limited-access highway in the late 1960s and early 1970s and renamed the Richmond Parkway (now the Korean War Veterans Parkway) ; however, NY 440 initially continued to follow the parkway. The segment of the West Shore Expressway southwest of Huguenot Avenue was opened  and became part of a realigned NY 440 on July 1, 1977. NY 440 left the expressway at Huguenot Avenue and followed Arthur Kill Road east to Richmond Avenue, where it continued north on its original alignment. The former alignment of NY 440 on the Richmond Parkway was redesignated as Temporary NY 440. When the West Shore Expressway was completed in 1976, the Temporary NY 440 designation was eliminated while NY 440 was shifted westward to follow the West Shore and Clove Lakes Expressways between Huguenot Avenue and the Willowbrook Expressway.

In the mid-1960s, officials in New Jersey and New York considered extending the I-287 designation eastward from its current terminus at the New Jersey Turnpike (I-95) to Staten Island via New Jersey Route 440 and the Richmond Parkway. The idea was eventually halted soon afterward. However, it is possible that the NYSDOT may reconsider these plans in the future. In 1990, the Willowbrook Expressway was renamed the Dr. Martin Luther King Jr. Expressway in honor of Martin Luther King Jr., the famous civil rights leader. However, it is sometimes still called the Willowbrook Expressway by many locals today. The West Shore Expressway was ceremonially designated the Pearl Harbor Veterans Expressway by New York Governor George Pataki in 1999. However, the expressway's official name did not change.

Exit list

See also

References

External links

 Outerbridge Crossing @ NYCROADS.com
 West Shore Expressway(NY 440) @ NYCROADS.com
 Dr. Martin Luther King Jr. Expressway(NY 440) @ NYCROADS.com
 Bayonne Bridge @ NYCROADS.com
 NY 440 (Greater New York Roads)

Expressways in New York City
Interstate 87 (New York)
440
Transportation in Staten Island
Robert Moses projects